A stele (plural steles or stelai) is a stone or wooden slab, generally taller than it is wide, erected as a monument, very often for funerary or commemorative purposes.

Stele may also refer to:

Stele monuments
See the list at Stele
Stele Forest, a museum for steles in Xi'an, China

People with the surname
Veronica Stele (born 1977), Argentine tennis player

Other uses
Stele (biology), in a vascular plant, the central part of the root or stem
Stele (Kurtág), a composition for orchestra by Hungarian composer György Kurtág (1994)
Stele II, an abstract sculpture (1973) by Ellsworth Kelly